Mary Alice Ward (1 September 1896 – 27 July 1972) was an Australian teacher and pastoralist born at Kooringa, Burra, South Australia. She is best remembered for her legendary hospitality as owner and operator of Banka Banka Station, a cattle station and World War II supply camp. In fact, she was known as "The Missuss of Banka Banka."

Biography

Early life and career

Ward was the eldest of eight children of John McEntyre, an engineer from Victor Harbor, and his wife Margaret Anne. By 1904, the family had moved to the Western Australian goldfields, living first at Kalgoorlie and then Coolgardie. Mary began teaching at Tunneys State School in June 1915, and gained her junior cadet training certificate in September of the next year. From 1918 to 1924 she taught at Kalgoorlie, Boulder and Carlisle. She was promoted to head teacher in 1924, and moved to Parkfield, Pingrup, Cottesloe, Wyering, Keysbrook and Latham before transferring to Wyndham, Western Australia in 1932.

Married life

On 27 December 1932, Mary Alice married Philip "Ted" Ward, a stockman, at the office of the district registrar in Wyndham. For two years, the Wards lived at Jack Kilfoyle's Rosewood station, 120 miles southeast of Wyndham. With Mary's brother Stuart, they joined the gold rush at Tennant Creek, Northern Territory, in 1935. Prospecting at a mine site that they called Blue Moon, the family struck gold, reputedly worth about $150,000. In 1941, the Wards bought the cattle station Banka Banka, where Mary supervised the development of an extensive garden.

Able widow

After her husband's death in 1959, Mary ably ran Banka Banka and the family's other stations. She also owned a butcher shop at Tennant Creek, supplying it from a slaughterhouse on the property. One of her cattle managers recalled that she spent money on the welfare of her Aboriginal staff – many of whom she trained in domestic and station duties – while economizing on repairs and improvements, and eschewing new management methods. She was known to have dismissed white employees because of their ill treatment of Aborigines. She acquired five houses at Tennant Creek for her old retainers and, despite objections from the local town management board, arranged for construction in 1968 and 1969 of a large red-brick building to house former employees and their relatives. The "Mary Ward Hostel," as it was known in addition to the "Pink Palace," was later used for a range of community purposes. The "Pink Palace" is currently the site of the Nyinkka Nyunyu Art and Culture Centre where over 130 Warumungu and Barkly Region artists sell their artwork.

Motherly figure

Having no children of her own, Ward cared for the babies of her Warumungu employees. In the 1950s, a native affairs branch inspector wrote that "youngsters on this station look the picture of health, and this is entirely due to the unremitting personal care and attention given by Mrs. Ward." She did not agree with the policy of removing part-Aborigines from their mothers. They sent children to school at Our Lady of the Sacred Heart (due to her Catholic faith) in Alice Springs at her own expense until 1961, when due to her efforts a government school opened at Banka Banka; the school's motto was 'Do it Well'.

Death and legacy

In 1970, suffering ill health, Mary Alice Ward sold Banka Banka to the American silver billionaire, Howard Hunt and moved to Adelaide, back in her native South Australia. She died on 27 July 1972, at her North Adelaide home, and was buried with Catholic rites in Centennial Park Cemetery.

References

Australian Dictionary of Biography, entry by David Nash (linguist)

1896 births
1972 deaths
Australian pastoralists
Australian educators
People from Burra, South Australia
19th-century Australian women
20th-century Australian women